The Daily Dispatch is a South African newspaper published in East London in the province of Eastern Cape. 

The weekend edition is titled Daily Dispatch Weekend Edition. 

Founded in 1872 as the East London Dispatch and Shipping and Mercantile Gazette, the Daily Dispatch is the Eastern Cape's best-selling daily with a circulation of about 26,147 copies as of the first quarter in 2015. The online offering is known as DispatchLIVE.

The newspaper, published in English, is well-known for its hard-hitting investigative reporting and also covers Eastern Cape news, sports, politics, business, jobs, and community events.

It has consistently been South Africa's best-performing daily newspaper, in terms of circulation growth, for the last several years.

The newspaper is internationally known for its editor from 1965 to 1977, Donald Woods. Woods became a friend of Steve Biko, leader of the Black Consciousness Movement, and provided support to Biko through his editorials. After Biko's death in police custody, Woods went into exile to expose the truth surrounding Biko's death in his book Biko.

During World War II the editor, and major shareholder, was Bernard Steer, father of noted journalist George Steer.

History
The History of the Daily Dispatch by Glyn Williams

Distribution areas

Distribution figures

Readership figures

Location
The newspaper's physical address is:
35 Caxton Street, East London, South Africa, 5201

See also
 List of newspapers in South Africa

References

External links
Daily Dispatch Website (DispatchLIVE)
SAARF Website

Daily News
Mass media in East London, Eastern Cape